Luis Fernando Herrera Arango (born June 12, 1962) is a retired football defender. He was capped 61 times and scored 1 international goal for Colombia between 1987 and 1996.
He is current head coach for Atlético Huila.

Career
Herrera (nicknamed Chonto) played most of his club career for Atlético Nacional in Colombia, where he was part of the team that won the Copa Libertadores in 1989. He also helped the club to win two Colombia league titles in 1991 and 1994.

Herrera played three matches at the 1994 World Cup, and four matches at the 1990 World Cup. He also played in three editions of the Copa América in 1987, 1991 and 1993.

Titles

References

External links

1962 births
Living people
Colombian footballers
Categoría Primera A players
Independiente Medellín footballers
América de Cali footballers
Atlético Nacional footballers
Colombia international footballers
1990 FIFA World Cup players
1994 FIFA World Cup players
1987 Copa América players
1991 Copa América players
1993 Copa América players
Association football defenders
Footballers from Medellín
Atlético Huila managers